SOLAR was an ESA science observatory on the Columbus Laboratory, which is part of the International Space Station. SOLAR was launched with Columbus on February 2008 aboard STS-122. It was externally mounted to Columbus with the European Technology Exposure Facility (EuTEF). SOLAR has three main space science instruments: SOVIM, SOLSPEC and SOL-ACES. Together they provide detailed measurements of the Sun's spectral irradiance. The SOLAR platform and its instruments are controlled from the Belgian User Support and Operations Centre (B.USOC), located at the Belgian Institute for Space Aeronomy (BISA) in Uccle, Belgium.

Instruments
SOVIM (Solar Variability and Irradiance Monitor) instrument is based on an earlier instrument (SOVA) which flew aboard the European Retrievable Carrier, launched on STS-46 in 1992. It is designed to measure solar radiation with wavelengths from 200 nanometers - 100 micrometers. This covers near-ultraviolet, visible and infrared areas of the spectrum.
SOLSPEC (Solar Spectral irradiance measurements) is designed to measure the solar spectral irradiance in the 165- to 3000-nanometer range with high spectral resolution.
SOL-ACES (Auto-calibrating Extreme Ultraviolet and Ultraviolet spectrometers) consists of four grazing incidence grating spectrometers. They are designed to measure the EUV/UV spectral regime (17 nanometers - 220 nanometers) with moderate spectral resolution.

Mission
The mission was originally planned for a 2003 launch, but was delayed following the Space Shuttle Columbia disaster. Some other components are also planned to be mounted externally on Columbus on future missions, including the Atomic Clock Ensemble in Space (ACES). Another name for SOLAR may be Solar Monitoring Observatory or SMO.

In 2012, the entire 450-tonne station was rotated so SOLAR could observe a full rotation of the Sun continuously. A Solar rotation takes about 24–28 days depending on the latitude.

SOLAR's mission ended in 2017 with the failure of all but one of its instruments. On the morning of January 28, 2020 SOLAR was removed from FRAM 1 where it rested since it was delivered on STS 122 and strapped to the side of Cygnus NG-12 with the SDS placed on the other side. SOLAR was released from the station on February 3, 2020 and burnt up in the atmosphere over the Pacific Ocean on March 13, 2020 ending the mission which spent a decade photographing the sun.

Visuals

See also
Scientific research on the ISS
Spectroscopy

References

External links
SOLAR at eoPortal
SOLAR at ESA
SOLSPEC homepage (includes photo gallery)

Science facilities on the International Space Station
Columbus (ISS module)
Missions to the Sun
Crewed space observatories
Solar observatories
Ultraviolet telescopes